The Bezhetsk Constituency (No.172) was a Russian legislative constituency in the Tver Oblast in 1993-2007. The constituency covered upstate Northern and Eastern Tver Oblast. Since 2016 most of the constituency was placed into Tver constituency.

Members elected

Election results

1993

|-
! colspan=2 style="background-color:#E9E9E9;text-align:left;vertical-align:top;" |Candidate
! style="background-color:#E9E9E9;text-align:left;vertical-align:top;" |Party
! style="background-color:#E9E9E9;text-align:right;" |Votes
! style="background-color:#E9E9E9;text-align:right;" |%
|-
|style="background-color:"|
|align=left|Vladimir Bayunov
|align=left|Independent
|
|24.31%
|-
|style="background-color:#019CDC"|
|align=left|Margarita Zheleznova
|align=left|Party of Russian Unity and Accord
| -
|24.10%
|-
| colspan="5" style="background-color:#E9E9E9;"|
|- style="font-weight:bold"
| colspan="3" style="text-align:left;" | Total
| 
| 100%
|-
| colspan="5" style="background-color:#E9E9E9;"|
|- style="font-weight:bold"
| colspan="4" |Source:
|
|}

1995

|-
! colspan=2 style="background-color:#E9E9E9;text-align:left;vertical-align:top;" |Candidate
! style="background-color:#E9E9E9;text-align:left;vertical-align:top;" |Party
! style="background-color:#E9E9E9;text-align:right;" |Votes
! style="background-color:#E9E9E9;text-align:right;" |%
|-
|style="background-color:"|
|align=left|Vladimir Bayunov (incumbent)
|align=left|Communist Party
|
|30.30%
|-
|style="background-color:"|
|align=left|Vladimir Lebedev
|align=left|Our Home – Russia
|
|13.27%
|-
|style="background-color:"|
|align=left|Tatyana Kalinina
|align=left|Agrarian Party
|
|12.38%
|-
|style="background-color:#C28314"|
|align=left|Vladimir Polevanov
|align=left|For the Motherland!
|
|8.04%
|-
|style="background-color:#1C1A0D"|
|align=left|Vladimir Baranov
|align=left|Forward, Russia!
|
|7.15%
|-
|style="background-color:"|
|align=left|Roman Blokhin
|align=left|Independent
|
|4.41%
|-
|style="background-color:#DA2021"|
|align=left|Andrey Dementyev
|align=left|Ivan Rybkin Bloc
|
|4.14%
|-
|style="background-color:"|
|align=left|Mikhail Vtulkin
|align=left|Independent
|
|3.13%
|-
|style="background-color:"|
|align=left|Mark Khasainov
|align=left|Independent
|
|2.21%
|-
|style="background-color:#000000"|
|colspan=2 |against all
|
|12.08%
|-
| colspan="5" style="background-color:#E9E9E9;"|
|- style="font-weight:bold"
| colspan="3" style="text-align:left;" | Total
| 
| 100%
|-
| colspan="5" style="background-color:#E9E9E9;"|
|- style="font-weight:bold"
| colspan="4" |Source:
|
|}

1999

|-
! colspan=2 style="background-color:#E9E9E9;text-align:left;vertical-align:top;" |Candidate
! style="background-color:#E9E9E9;text-align:left;vertical-align:top;" |Party
! style="background-color:#E9E9E9;text-align:right;" |Votes
! style="background-color:#E9E9E9;text-align:right;" |%
|-
|style="background-color:"|
|align=left|Vyacheslav Zorkin
|align=left|Communist Party
|
|26.14%
|-
|style="background-color:"|
|align=left|Sergey Bystrov
|align=left|Independent
|
|14.23%
|-
|style="background-color:#1042A5"|
|align=left|Nikolay Rumyantsev
|align=left|Union of Right Forces
|
|9.21%
|-
|style="background-color:"|
|align=left|Vladimir Kostyuchenko
|align=left|Independent
|
|8.36%
|-
|style="background-color:"|
|align=left|Vladimir Zorin
|align=left|Our Home – Russia
|
|6.85%
|-
|style="background-color:"|
|align=left|Yury Zimin
|align=left|Liberal Democratic Party
|
|6.76%
|-
|style="background-color:#FCCA19"|
|align=left|Vyacheslav Vorontsov
|align=left|Congress of Russian Communities-Yury Boldyrev Movement
|
|3.53%
|-
|style="background-color:"|
|align=left|Sergey Osadchy
|align=left|Independent
|
|2.90%
|-
|style="background-color:"|
|align=left|Dmitry Shebalin
|align=left|Independent
|
|1.85%
|-
|style="background-color:#084284"|
|align=left|Valery Nikitin
|align=left|Spiritual Heritage
|
|1.65%
|-
|style="background-color:#000000"|
|colspan=2 |against all
|
|14.86%
|-
| colspan="5" style="background-color:#E9E9E9;"|
|- style="font-weight:bold"
| colspan="3" style="text-align:left;" | Total
| 
| 100%
|-
| colspan="5" style="background-color:#E9E9E9;"|
|- style="font-weight:bold"
| colspan="4" |Source:
|
|}

2003

|-
! colspan=2 style="background-color:#E9E9E9;text-align:left;vertical-align:top;" |Candidate
! style="background-color:#E9E9E9;text-align:left;vertical-align:top;" |Party
! style="background-color:#E9E9E9;text-align:right;" |Votes
! style="background-color:#E9E9E9;text-align:right;" |%
|-
|style="background-color:"|
|align=left|Aleksandr Tyagunov
|align=left|United Russia
|
|19.93%
|-
|style="background-color:"|
|align=left|Vladimir Bayunov
|align=left|Independent
|
|16.47%
|-
|style="background-color:"|
|align=left|Vyacheslav Zorkin (incumbent)
|align=left|Communist Party
|
|10.88%
|-
|style="background-color:"|
|align=left|Boris Fomin
|align=left|Industrial Party (Prompartiya)
|
|5.49%
|-
|style="background-color:"|
|align=left|Aleksandr Anokhin
|align=left|Liberal Democratic Party
|
|4.88%
|-
|style="background-color:"|
|align=left|Aleksandr Tsalko
|align=left|Independent
|
|3.75%
|-
|style="background-color:"|
|align=left|Leonid Ostrenkov
|align=left|Agrarian Party
|
|3.11%
|-
|style="background-color:"|
|align=left|Mikhail Markelov
|align=left|Rodina
|
|2.98%
|-
|style="background-color:"|
|align=left|Nadezhda Goncharova
|align=left|Independent
|
|2.94%
|-
|style="background-color:#1042A5"|
|align=left|Nikolay Rumyantsev
|align=left|Union of Right Forces
|
|2.55%
|-
|style="background:"| 
|align=left|Galina Mefed
|align=left|Yabloko
|
|2.37%
|-
|style="background:#7C73CC"| 
|align=left|Sergey Selivanov
|align=left|Great Russia–Eurasian Union
|
|1.29%
|-
|style="background-color:#164C8C"|
|align=left|Kirill Monastyrsky
|align=left|United Russian Party Rus'
|
|0.98%
|-
|style="background-color:#000000"|
|colspan=2 |against all
|
|18.89%
|-
| colspan="5" style="background-color:#E9E9E9;"|
|- style="font-weight:bold"
| colspan="3" style="text-align:left;" | Total
| 
| 100%
|-
| colspan="5" style="background-color:#E9E9E9;"|
|- style="font-weight:bold"
| colspan="4" |Source:
|
|}

Notes

References

Obsolete Russian legislative constituencies
Politics of Tver Oblast